Tie Break may refer to:

A tiebreaker at the end of a set or game such as tennis 
Tie Break (Austrian band) -an Austrian boyband
Tie Break (jazz ensemble)- a Polish jazz group